The year 1720 in science and technology involved some significant events.

Astronomy
 February 10 – Edmond Halley is appointed as Astronomer Royal of England.

Medicine
 May – First patient admitted to the Westminster Public Infirmary, predecessor of St George's Hospital, London.
 Dr Steevens' Hospital is established at Kilmainham, Dublin.
 Great Plague of Marseille, the last major outbreak of bubonic plague in Europe.

Physics
 Willem 's Gravesande publishes Physices elementa mathematica, experimentis confirmata, sive introductio ad philosophiam Newtonianam, an introduction to Newtonian physics, in Leiden.

Technology
 A theodolite is developed by Jonathan Sisson of England.
 Pinchbeck is invented by English watchmaker Christopher Pinchbeck; it is an alloy of 83% copper and 17% zinc, creating a strong, hard-wearing metal which has the appearance and weight of 20 carat gold.
 An early chronograph is invented which has only mechanical parts in it.
 Henry de Saumarez (of the Channel Islands) produces an instrument called the Marine Surveyor intended to measure a ship's velocity.
 A single-action five-pedal harp is developed by Jacob Hochbrucker of Bavaria which can raise the pitch of the selected strings by a half step.
 approx. date – Joseph Williamson uses a differential gear in a clock.

Births
 January 30 – Charles De Geer, Swedish industrialist and entomologist (died 1778) 
 March 13 – Charles Bonnet, Genevan naturalist and philosophical writer (died 1793)
 July 18 – Gilbert White, English naturalist (died 1793)
 October 8 – Geneviève Thiroux d'Arconville, French novelist, translator and chemist (d. 1805) 
 November 5 - Jean Baptiste Christophore Fusée Aublet, French pharmacist and botanist (died 1778)
 December ? – James Hargreaves, English inventor (died 1778)
 approx. date – Dmitry Ivanovich Vinogradov, Russian chemist and (died 1758)

Deaths
 December 29 – Maria Margarethe Kirch, German astronomer (born 1670)
 David Gregory, Scottish physician and inventor (born 1625)

References

 
18th century in science
1720s in science